Miloš Minić (Милош Минић) (August 28, 1914, Preljina, Čačak, Kingdom of Serbia – September 5, 2003, Belgrade, Serbia-Montenegro) was a Yugoslav Serbian communist politician.

Biography
Minić graduated from secondary school in Čačak, then from the University of Belgrade's Law School. From 1935 he was a member of the then-illegal Young Communist League of Yugoslavia (SKOJ), as well as the Communist Party of Yugoslavia (KPJ), holding senior positions in both organizations. During the Partisans' war against Germany and Italy, Minić held both party and military posts from 1941.

After the liberation of Serbia from Nazi occupation, he was the head of Department for the Protection of the People's Belgrade branch, then public prosecutor of Serbia and representative of the military prosecutor of the Yugoslav People's Army (JNA). He then held several posts in the Yugoslav and Serbian government. He was the Minister for Foreign Affairs of Yugoslavia from December 16, 1972 to May 17, 1978, and during this time signed the Treaty of Osimo, which resolved border disputes between Italy and Yugoslavia.

References

1914 births
2003 deaths
Politicians from Čačak
Yugoslav Partisans members
Serbian people of World War II
University of Belgrade Faculty of Law alumni
Presidents of Serbia within Yugoslavia
Recipients of the Order of the People's Hero
League of Communists of Serbia politicians
Mayors of Belgrade
Foreign ministers of Yugoslavia
Recipients of the Order of the Hero of Socialist Labour